Raggedy Rose is a 1926 film American silent comedy film starring Mabel Normand. The film was co-written by Stan Laurel, and directed by Richard Wallace.

Cast
 Mabel Normand as Raggedy Rose
 Carl Miller as Ted Tudor
 Max Davidson as Moe Ginsberg
 James Finlayson as Simpson Sniffle
 Anita Garvin as Janice
 Laura La Varnie as her mother
 Jerry Mandy as the chauffeur

Plot
Rose (Normand), who works for a junk dealer (Davidson), dreams of romance with bachelor Ted Tudor (Miller).

Production notes
Oliver Hardy had been injured in a cooking accident at home where he burned his arm after a frying pan of scalding grease spilled onto it, and was still recovering when filming for Raggedy Rose began. This accident also forced Hardy to be replaced by Stan Laurel in the Hal Roach comedy Get 'Em Young.

See also
 Stan Laurel filmography

References

External links 
 
 
 
 Raggedy Rose at SilentEra

1926 films
Silent American comedy films
American silent feature films
American black-and-white films
Films directed by Richard Wallace
American independent films
Pathé Exchange films
1926 comedy films
1920s independent films
1920s American films